Al-Jami' as-Saghir is a Sunni hadith collection authored by the Islamic scholar Jalaluddin al-Suyuti (1445 – 1505 CE/ 849 - 911 H).

Description

Contents
As-Saghir is a non-primary hadith work which contains 10,031 hadith. Al-Suyuti extracted all of the hadiths related to the prophet's speech contrary to the prophets actions and compiled them in his smaller collection entitling it Jami al-Saghir.

Commentary
The Hadith scholar Al-Munawi published a famous commentary entitled Fayd al-Qadir Sharh al-Jami` al-Saghir in 8 huge volumes and has become an important reference for the late hadith studies.

Al-Jami' al-Kabir
As-Saghir is an abridgement of al-Suyuti's larger work al-Jami' al-Kabir. His attempt to compile all of the remaining hadiths in one massive collection, the Jami al-Kabir, was sadly cut short after his passing. What remained was published in thirty large volumes, showcasing around nine to ten alphabetic orderings of the prophetic traditions. 

Which in turn was further ordered and arranged in al-Mutaqqi al-Hindi's work Kanz al-Ummal.

See also
List of Sunni books

References

External links
Jami' al-Saghir - Online library page where one can access digitised scans of a hand written manuscript, translations, authentication works and the original arabic printed in 11 volumes.

Sunni literature
Sunni hadith collections